The tournaments of the qualifications for the 2022 Women's European Water Polo Championship were held between 17 February and 6 March 2022. 14 teams, split into three groups, played in the qualifications for the final tournament. The top two teams from each group advanced to the European Championships.

Group A

All times are (UTC+2).

Group B

All times are (UTC+1).

Group C

All times are (UTC+1).

See also
2022 Men's European Water Polo Championship Qualifiers

References

Women's European Water Polo Championship